Irwin is a given name, and may refer to:
 
 Irwin Allen (1916–1991), television and film producer
 Irwin Barker, Canadian comedian and writer
 Irwin Caplan (1919–2007), American cartoonist
 Irwin Chusid, record producer, journalist, self-described landmark preservationist, and radio personality
 Irwin Cohen (1952–2012), American Olympic judoka
 Irwin Corey (born 1914), American comic and film actor
 Irwin Cotler (born 1940), former Minister of Justice and Attorney General of Canada
 Irwin Donenfeld, former Executive Vice President and Editorial Director of DC Comics
 Irwin Edman (1896–1954), American philosopher and professor of philosophy
 Irwin Freedberg, American professor of dermatology at New York University
 Irwin Glusker (1924–2022), American art director
 Irwin Goodman (1943–1991), Finnish singer
 Irwin Hasen (born 1918), cartoonist best known for Wildcat and Dondi
 Irwin Hoffman (born 1924), American conductor
 Irwin M. Jacobs (born 1933), electrical engineer and chairman of Qualcomm
 Irwin Kra (born 1937), American mathematician
 Irwin Kula (born 1957), American rabbi and author
 Irwin McIntosh (1926–1988), former Lieutenant Governor of Saskatchewan
 Irwin Molasky (1927–2020), American real estate developer and philanthropist
 Irwin Rose (born 1926), American biologist, co-recipient of the 2004 Nobel Prize in Chemistry
 Irwin Schiff (born 1928), tax protester
 Irwin Shaw (1913–1984), American playwright, screenwriter and author
 Irwin Silber (born 1925), American writer
 Irwin Stelzer (born 1932), American economist and business columnist for The Sunday Times (UK) and The Courier-Mail
 Irwin Stone (1907–1984), biochemist, chemical engineer, and author
 Irwin Thomas (born 1971), lead singer in the Australian band Southern Sons
 Irwin Winkler, American film producer and director
 Irwin Yablans (born 1934), independent film producer and distributor
Fictional characters
 Irwin (Billy and Mandy), a fictional character from The Grim Adventures of Billy and Mandy

See also 
 Earvin
 Ervin (disambiguation)
 Ervine
 Erving (disambiguation)
 Erwan
 Erwin (disambiguation)
 Irmin (disambiguation)
 Irvin
 Irvine (disambiguation)
 Irving (disambiguation)
 Irwin (disambiguation)
 Irwin (surname)